Labyrinthocyathus is a genus of cnidarians belonging to the family Caryophylliidae.

The species of this genus are found in Africa, Southeastern Asia, Northern America and Australia.

Species:

Labyrinthocyathus delicatus 
Labyrinthocyathus facetus 
Labyrinthocyathus langae 
Labyrinthocyathus limatulus 
Labyrinthocyathus quaylei

References

Caryophylliidae
Scleractinia genera